Charles Rich, 4th Earl of Warwick (abt 1623 – 24 Aug 1673), styled The Honourable Charles Rich until 1658, was an English peer and politician.

Rich was the second son of Robert Rich, 2nd Earl of Warwick and Frances Hatton. As a young man, he was noted for being handsome, charming, cheerful and penniless. His wife was Lady Mary Boyle, daughter of Richard Boyle, 1st Earl of Cork, and his second wife Catherine Fenton. He became intimate with Lady Mary when he helped to nurse her through an attack of measles. It was a love marriage: Mary to her father's intense displeasure, had refused to enter the marriage arranged by him with James Hamilton, later Earl of Clanbrassil, on the grounds that she found him repulsive, and chose Charles instead. Her father who was genuinely fond of her despite their differences eventually gave his consent, as well as a generous dowry,  but the couple do not seem to have been happy. Mary in her diaries refers to "violent and passionate disputes". There may have been faults on both sides, since Mary was exceptionally stubborn and strong-minded (as shown by her defiance of her formidable father), and in later years became almost fanatically devout, but it was generally agreed that the greater blame lay with Rich, whose chronic ill-health made him bad-tempered and tyrannical.

In public life, Rich represented Sandwich in Parliament from 1645 to 1648. He was also Custos Rotulorum of Essex. He succeeded his brother Robert in the earldom in 1658.

Lord Warwick died in 1673, after "twenty years of gout". His only son had predeceased him and had no children by his wife Anne Cavendish, so the title passed to his cousin, Charles Rich, 2nd Earl of Holland. His only other child Elizabeth had died in infancy. Despite their quarrels, he left all his property to his widow for her life, an unusual step at the time. The love of his life died five years later.

References

1620s births
1673 deaths
17th-century English nobility
Earls of Warwick (1618 creation)
Charles
English MPs 1640–1648